Aptoide is an online marketplace for mobile applications which runs on the Android operating system. In Aptoide, unlike the Android-default Play Store, there is not a unique and centralized store; instead, each user manages their own store. The software package is published by Aptoide S.A., a for-profit company incorporated in 2011, and headquartered in Lisbon, Portugal.

There are several versions of the Aptoide app: Aptoide for smartphones and tablets, Aptoide TV an edition for smart TVs and STBs, Aptoide VR and Aptoide Kids developed for children's devices.

The Android application used to access the stores is open source, and there are several forks such as F-Droid. The communication between the client and servers is done using an open protocol based on XML.

The concept is inspired by the APT packaging manager, which can work with multiple sources (repositories). When the user wants a package, they can use the client to search for sources where the application is stored.

The name Aptoide is formed from the words "APT" (the Debian package manager) and "oide" (the last syllable of "Android").

History

Aptoide started as a proposal of Paulo Trezentos at the 2009 Caixa Mágica Summer Camp. The proposal was accepted and later became what today is Aptoide. This first stage of development was later developed in the scope of SAPO Summerbits.

The idea behind Aptoide came from different sources. On one hand, the research in Linux installers in Mancoosi European Project, Paulo Trezentos PhD project and Portugal Telecom A5 phone, project where the team participated.

In the end of 2010, it was launched in the Bazaar Android site. Bazaar Android provided the possibility for the users to create their own store. In August 2012, Aptoide and Bazaar Android brands were merged to allow a better communication.

In 2011, Aptoide S.A. was incorporated in Lisbon, Portugal, as a spin-off of CM Software.

In 2011, F-Droid was forked from Aptoide.

In 2013, Aptoide received a total of 750,000 euros in seed funding from Portugal Ventures.

In 2015, the company secured a Series A financing round of 3.7 million euros (4 million dollars), led by German venture capital firm e.ventures with co-investment from Gobi Partners (China) and Golden Gate Ventures (Singapore). The investment has allowed Aptoide to grow its team, currently having over 60 employees.

In 2014, Aptoide filed a European Union Antitrust complaint against Google, claiming that Google creates obstacles for users to install third-party app stores, links essential services with Google Play (thus blocking, again, these third-party app stores), and blocks access to Aptoide websites in its Chrome Web browser.

In May 2015, Aptoide announced that it would start its operations in Asia by opening an office in Singapore.

In 2017, Aptoide announced that it would be working with AppCoin and "enter the digital currency business with the plainly named AppCoins. Launched in conjunction with the 2017 Web Summit edition, the $18 million Initial Coin Offering (ICO) will allow users to use AppCoins to pay each other or for in-app purchases, such as game upgrades." Appcoin's 200 million users will be incentivized to engage with advertising to earn currency.

Description

Android client

Aptoide client allows one to search, browse and install applications in the Android phone. Aptoide is available in 17 languages.

To install Aptoide, the user has to retrieve the APK (installable file) from the official site. The installation is not available through Google Play Store due to 4.5 Non-compete clause of Google Play Developer Distribution Agreement. This is the same clause that blocks the Amazon Appstore application from being available through Google Play. Installing Aptoide requires users to allow the installation from "Unknown sources" in Android settings.

After the installation of Aptoide, the user can add stores (repositories). Besides the default store (Apps), many other are available from different stores. When a store is added using the URL of the store, Aptoide retrieves the list of the applications and stores it locally. The user can then browse in the applications or search in the Internet for other stores.

In June 2011, Aptoide Uploader was released as a "sister" application from the same development team. Aptoide Uploader is an Android app that allows users to upload to an existent Aptoide store.

Aptoide Uploader uses the available Aptoide Webservices to upload the application. The submitted APK file is kept in the user's store where they can manage.

For the user that wants to backup their apps to a private store, it is advisable to use Aptoide Apps Backup that keeps a record of the apps that are backed up. All the applications in stores are managed using a backoffice in the Aptoide site.

Aptoide Apps Backup uses the webservices to upload the APK file to the store. To know what applications are already backed up, Aptoide Apps Backup uses the info.xml XML file available in the store.

Interfaces
The communication between the Android client applications and the store is done using a XML file called info.xml. This file lists the applications in the store as well the basic information about each application available. Info.xml is open and a detailed definition is available.

Part of info.xml file:

<apklst>
  <version>5</version>
  <repository>
    <basepath>http://mirror.apk10.aptoide.com/apks/10/aptoide-f63c6f2461f65f32b6d144d6d2ff982e/aptoidedev/</basepath>
    <appscount>1</appscount>
    ...
  </repository>
  <package>
    <name>Aptoide</name>
      ...
  </package>

There are two other XML files: extra.xml and stats.xml.

Extra.xml contains additional information about the apps such as the full description. The file "stats.xml" contains the downloads and likes of the available applications.

Usage

Aptoide usage was reported as follows:

See also 
 List of mobile app distribution platforms

References

External links
 
 Aptoide

Android (operating system) software
Mobile software distribution platforms
Online marketplaces of Portugal
Portuguese brands